Ezerovo may refer to the following places in Bulgaria:

 Ezerovo, Plovdiv Province
 Ezerovo, Varna Province, a village in Beloslav Municipality
 Ezerovo, a village merged with Ustovo and Raykovo in 1960 to form the town of Smolyan